Martin Iványi (born 16 August 1995 in Pápa) is a Hungarian professional footballer who plays for Lombard-Pápa TFC.

Club statistics

Updated to games played as of 6 December 2014.

External links
MLSZ 
HLSZ 

1995 births
Living people
People from Pápa
Hungarian footballers
Association football midfielders
Lombard-Pápa TFC footballers
Nemzeti Bajnokság I players
Sportspeople from Veszprém County